William Tierney may refer to:
 William L. Tierney (1876–1958), U.S. Representative from Connecticut
 William G. Tierney, American scholar of higher education
 Bill Tierney (William G. Tierney, born 1952), American lacrosse coach
 Bill Tierney (baseball) (William J. Tierney, 1858–1898), Major League Baseball player